Jatunhuma (possibly from Quechua hatun big, superior, principal, uma mountain top / head), Jatunpampa (possibly from Quechua pampa plain) or Pico Tres (Spanish for "peak three") is a mountain in the Vilcanota mountain range in the Andes of Peru, about  high. It is situated in the Cusco Region, Canchis Province, Pitumarca District, and in the Quispicanchi Province, Ocongate District. Hatunuma lies northwest of the large lake named Sibinacocha and southeast of Callangate.

First Ascent 
Jatunhuma was first climbed by Günther Hauser, Theodore Achilles, Bernhard Kuhn and Wiedmann (Germany) 27th July 1957.

Elevation 
Other data from available digital elevation models: SRTM 6078 metres, ASTER 6026 metres and TanDEM-X 5969 metres. The height of the nearest key col is 5367 meters, leading to a topographic prominence of 726 meters. Jatunhuma is considered a Mountain Subgroup according to the Dominance System  and its dominance is 11.92%. Its parent peak is Alcamarinayoc and the Topographic isolation is 6.8 kilometers.

See also 
 Huarurumicocha

References

Mountains of Peru
Mountains of Cusco Region
Six-thousanders of the Andes
Glaciers of Peru